Ponta da Mina is a headland located some 2 km northeast of Santo António, the island capital of Príncipe in São Tomé and Príncipe. The point is on the southern shores of Baía de Santo António. It is fringed by rocks, and the ancient fortress Fortaleza de Santo António da Ponta da Mina stands at its summit.

Located next to the fortress is a lighthouse, built in 1996.

References

Príncipe
Landforms of São Tomé and Príncipe